Verus Pharmaceuticals was a privately held pharmaceutical company based in San Diego, California, USA. It was founded in November 2002 by three former Dura Pharmaceuticals executives, Bob Keith, Peter Schineller and Cam Garner, with an initial focus on the treatment of asthma, allergies and related diseases and conditions, specifically in children. 

Verus is best known for its development and manufacturing of Twinject, the first (and currently only) two-dose epinephrine autoinjector. The Twinject was later licensed to Paladin Labs for manufacturing and distribution in Canada (released in September 2006.) The licence for manufacturing and distribution in Europe (and option for worldwide distribution) was sold to UCB.

Verus Pharmaceuticals was dissolved in March 2008 after selling its Twinject product to Sciele Pharma for $29 million.

In 2009, Verus filed a lawsuit against AstraZeneca and Tika Lakemedel, "seeking $1.3 billion on claims of fraud, breach of contract, and conversion."

See also
 List of companies headquartered in San Diego, California
 Pharmaceutical company
 Twinject

References 

 "Coming of Age: Pediatric Pharmaceuticals Get Some Attention From Legislators And Venture Capitalists", Healthcare Corporate Finance News, June 2005.
 Verus Pharmaceuticals official website
 Twinject official website

Pharmaceutical companies of the United States
Pharmaceutical companies established in 2002
Pharmaceutical companies disestablished in 2008
Companies based in San Diego
Privately held companies based in California
2002 establishments in California
Health care companies based in California